{{Infobox person
| name               = Haruka Chisuga
| image              = 
| alt                = 
| caption            = 
| native_name        = 千菅 春香
| native_name_lang   = ja
| birth_name         = 
| birth_date         = 
| birth_place        = Morioka, Iwate Prefecture, Japan
| death_date         = 
| death_place        =
| occupation         = 
| years_active       = 2013–present
| agent              = Fortunerest
| notable_works      = {{Plainlist|
Shirobako as Shizuka Sakaki
Angels of Death (video game) as Rachel "Ray" Gardner The Asterisk War as Sylvia RyuneheimGirls Beyond the Wasteland as Sayuki Kuroda
}}
| height             = 157 cm
| website            = 
| module             = 
}}
 is a Japanese voice actress and singer from Morioka, Iwate Prefecture affiliated with the agency Fortunerest. As a singer, she is signed to Victor Entertainment under their label Flying Dog.

Biography
During her early childhood, Chisuga took classical piano lessons. During high school, Chisuga decided to become a voice actress and singer after seeing a video of Nana Mizuki performing. She was discovered in 2012 after winning the Miss Macross 30 contest, which was held to celebrate the 30th anniversary of the Macross franchise. She played her first main role as Shizuka Sakaki in the 2014 anime television series Shirobako.

 Filmography 
Television animation
2013Ore no Imōto ga Konna ni Kawaii Wake ga Nai. as Fairy (ep 5)Strike the Blood as D-Type, Yuko Tanahara (ep 5&10)Tamayura: More Aggressive as Junior (ep 12), School trip student (ep 8.5)White Album 2 as Tomo's Friend (ep 7), Tsukumi (ep 1)

2014Amagi Brilliant Park as Shiina ChūjōBlue Spring Ride as schoolgirlLord Marksman and Vanadis as Child (eps 5&13), Maid (ep 1)Love Live! 2nd Season as ClassmateM3 the dark metal as Tasaki, Mukuro Shirobako as Shizuka Sakaki, Lucy Weller (ep 24)Soul Eater Not! as Tsugumi HarudoriYona of the Dawn as Court lady (ep 1), Girl (ep 22), young Kija (ep 10), Wind Clan member (ep 4), Woman (ep 17), Young lady (ep 21)

2015Gourmet Girl Graffiti as Hina Yamazaki, Announcer (ep 4)Go! Princess PreCure as Hanae KomoriSeraph of the End as young Mikaela (ep 1), little girl (eps 7,8)Wish Upon the Pleiades as Theater Festival Announcer (ep 5)Hibike! Euphonium as Kitauji concert band member (eps 2,3,4 & 10), Kohaku Kawashima (ep 8)Aquarion Logos as Kokone KikogamiThe Idolmaster Cinderella Girls 2nd Season as Ryo MatsunagaThe Asterisk War as Sylvia RyuneheimHeavy Object as Girl (ep 6)

2016Girls Beyond the Wasteland as Sayuki KurodaHaruchika as Miyoko NarushimaMyriad Colors Phantom World as Contest of Strength Phantom (ep 3)Korogashi-ya no pun as HotaruThe Asterisk War 2nd Season as Sylvia RyuneheimAlderamin on the Sky as Haroma Bekker

2017Miss Kobayashi's Dragon Maid as GirlTsuki ga Kirei as Miu ImazuThe Idolmaster Cinderella Girls Theater as Ryo Matsunaga

2018Angels of Death as RachelThe Seven Deadly Sins: Revival of the Commandments as Zaneri

2019Is It Wrong to Try to Pick Up Girls in a Dungeon? II as Sanjōno HaruhimeTenka Hyakken ~Meiji-kan e Yōkoso!~ as Goō Yoshimitsu

2020Is It Wrong to Try to Pick Up Girls in a Dungeon? III as Sanjōno Haruhime

2021Blue Reflection Ray as Ruka Hanari

2022Eternal Boys as PepechanIs It Wrong to Try to Pick Up Girls in a Dungeon? IV as Sanjōno Haruhime

OVA/OADZetsumetsu Kigu Shōjo Amazing Twins (2014) as ManaAmagi Brilliant Park (2015) as Shiina ChūjōAkatsuki no Yona (2015) as young Kija

ONA7 Seeds (2019) as Koruri

Anime filmsThe Laws of the Universe Part 0 (2015) as NatsumiSound! Euphonium: The Movie - Welcome to the Kitauji High School Concert Band (2016) as Brass Band MemberPretty Cure Dream Stars! Movie (2017) as Komori HanaeHuman Lost (2019) as TsunekoShirobako: The Movie (2020) as Shizuka Sakaki

Video games
2013Macross 30: Voices across the Galaxy (PlayStation 3) as Mina Forte

2014Soul Eater x Soul Eater Not!〜Satsubatsu? Ukiuki? Card Battle!〜 as Harudori TsugumiHeroes Placement as Chie Miyazawa

2015The Idolmaster Cinderella Girls as Ryo MatsunagaThe Idolmaster Cinderella Girls: Starlight Stage as Ryo MatsunagaChō Ginga Sendan (PC game) as Yūko Hoshi

2016Ensemble Girls! as Konan YakoThe Asterisk War Festa Kirameki no Stella as Lyyneheym SylviaThe Asterisk War Festa Houka Kenran as Lyyneheym SylviaQuiz RPG: The World of Mystic Wiz as Noin KeraGirls Beyond the Wasteland as Kuroda SayukiRage of Bahamut as ImeraNeji-maki Seirei Senki Amekagami no Alderamin ROAD OF ROYAL KNIGHTS as Haroma BeckerMacrossΔScramble as Mina ForteMegami Meguri as AmenosagumeYamato Chronicle Sousei as HimikoYome Collection as Sakaki Shizuka

2017Damnachi -Cross・Isutoria- as Sanjouno HarukiTenge Hyaku Ken - Ki - as Goou YoshimitsuMon Musume ☆ wa 〜 Remu as Ashley

2018Angels of Death as Rachel Gardner (Video Game: Anime Adaption Summer 2018)

2020Hypnosis Mic -Alternative Rap Battle- as Amiria Nakiri

2022Arknights'' as Rockrock

Discography

Singles

Albums

References

External links
 Official blog 
 Official website 
 Official agency profile 
 Flying Dog profile 
 

1992 births
Living people
Anime singers
Japanese women singers
Japanese video game actresses
Japanese voice actresses
Musicians from Iwate Prefecture
Voice actresses from Iwate Prefecture